Michael Showalter (born June 17, 1970) is an American comedian, actor, director, writer, and producer. He first came to recognition as a cast member on MTV's The State, which aired from 1993 to 1995. He and David Wain created the Wet Hot American Summer franchise, with Showalter co-writing and starring in Wet Hot American Summer (2001), and the Netflix series. Showalter wrote and directed The Baxter (2005), in which he starred with Michelle Williams, Justin Theroux, and Elizabeth Banks. Both films featured many of his co-stars from The State, and so do several of his other projects. Showalter is also a co-creator, co-producer, actor, and writer for the TV series Search Party. He directed the 2017 critically acclaimed feature film The Big Sick.

Early life
Showalter was born in Princeton, New Jersey, the son of Elaine Showalter (née Cottler), an author, feminist literary critic, and professor of English, and English Showalter, a Yale-educated professor of 18th century French literature. His father is Episcopalian and his mother is Jewish. He has one older sister, Vinca Showalter LaFleur, a professional speechwriter. He attended Princeton High School. For five years, Showalter shared an apartment with his friend, comedian and actress Andrea Rosen.

Career
Showalter began his undergraduate studies at New York University, where he joined the sketch comedy group The New Group. He transferred to and graduated from Brown University. After he completed college, The New Group changed its name to The State and began creating video shorts for an MTV show called You Wrote It, You Watch It, hosted by Jon Stewart. The comedy troupe then got its own sketch comedy TV series, The State , which aired for two years on MTV.

Showalter has also had several smaller roles in movies and TV shows. He played Ron Parker, the arrogant host of Cheap Seats, on ESPN Classic in the pilot episode. However, after a bookcase fell on Showalter's character, tape librarians (and brothers) Randy and Jason Sklar took over the hosting duties. Showalter spent a brief time as a correspondent on The Daily Show (1996). He is also one half of The Doilies, an acoustic comedy band, in which he sings lead vocals opposite guitarist Zak Orth. In 2005 he wrote, directed and starred in the film The Baxter.

Showalter is the host of The Michael Showalter Showalter, an original Internet series on Collegehumor.com which premiered January 16, 2007. His first guest was comedian Zach Galifianakis. Other guests have included David Cross, Michael Ian Black, Paul Rudd, David Wain, Andy Samberg, Michael Cera, and Mike Birbiglia. In the fall and winter of 2006, Showalter toured the US with frequent collaborator Michael Ian Black. In March 2007 Showalter briefly toured as the opening act for Janeane Garofalo. The Ten reunites him with frequent collaborators from The State.

Showalter signed with JDub Records, a non-profit record label, in June 2007. He released his first stand-up CD titled Sandwiches & Cats  in November 2007. He teaches screenwriting at New York University's Graduate Film School.

Showalter teamed up once more with Michael Ian Black in the Comedy Central series Michael and Michael Have Issues, which premiered in July 2009. The show detailed the two Michaels' trials and tribulations as they create a television series. They confirmed the series' cancellation in early 2010.

In an interview with The Rumpus in February 2009, Showalter talked about a memoir he is working on. "I am writing an 'important' memoir about not being able to write an important memoir. It winds up being kind of a novel-length comedic essay on insecurity and procrastination."  The book, Mr. Funny Pants, was published in February 2011.

He appeared twice on the NBC drama Law & Order: in the episode "Endurance", which aired on October 18, 2000, and in the episode "Reality Bites", which aired on October 16, 2009.

Showalter also appeared in a series of commercials advertising the Toyota Yaris, starting in late 2011.

In 2013 Showalter and Michael Ian Black launched a podcast called "Topics" in which the duo discuss evergreen topics in a serious manner, although if something funny comes up, it's okay.

Showalter was a writer on the ABC sitcom Super Fun Night.
 
In 2014, Showalter co-wrote with David Wain They Came Together. Wain and Showalter then co-wrote the eight-episode Netflix prequel Wet Hot American Summer: First Day of Camp based on the 2001 film with almost the entire cast of the original film returning. Showalter himself appeared as Gerald "Coop" Cooperberg and President Ronald Reagan in the series. The series premiered on July 31, 2015, and was more well received by critics. He also co-wrote and starred in the Netflix sequel Wet Hot American Summer: Ten Years Later which premiered in 2017.

In 2015 his film Hello, My Name Is Doris debuted at SXSW, where it was acquired by Roadside Attractions. It was released in the United States in March 2016, and received critical acclaim.

His 2017 film The Big Sick starred Kumail Nanjiani, Zoe Kazan, Holly Hunter and Ray Romano. It saw a wide theatrical release and had an overwhelmingly positive 98% fresh rating on Rotten Tomatoes, and was nominated for the Academy Award for Best Original Screenplay.

Showalter next directed the 2020 film The Lovebirds, starring Kumail Nanjiani of The Big Sick, along with Issa Rae, Anna Camp and Paul Sparks. The film was scheduled for theatrical release in the United States on April 3, 2020, however due to the worldwide COVID-19 pandemic its theatrical release was cancelled, similar to many other films, and it premiered on Netflix on May 22, 2020. More recently, he signed an overall deal with HBO Max.

Personal life
Showalter married Anne Kalin Ellis on January 16, 2011, in New York. Anne gave birth to their twin children in 2014.

Filmography

Film

Acting roles

Television

Acting roles

References

External links

Official website
April 2008 interview with Paradigm
Michael Showalter Interviews Human Giant

1970 births
Living people
American male comedians
American male film actors
21st-century American male actors
American male screenwriters
American male television actors
American sketch comedians
American television writers
American male voice actors
Comedy film directors
Film producers from New Jersey
Brown University alumni
Jewish American male actors
Jewish American comedians
Male actors from New Jersey
New York University alumni
People from Princeton, New Jersey
Princeton High School (New Jersey) alumni
American male television writers
Film directors from New Jersey
Screenwriters from New Jersey
21st-century American comedians
21st-century American screenwriters
Jewish American male comedians
21st-century American male writers
21st-century American Jews
Television producers from New Jersey